Julio Utrilla Cano (born March 5, 1967) is a Spanish politician and a member of the Congress of Deputies for the Vox party.

Cano studied at the Technical University of Madrid and is a mining engineer by profession. Cano has also been a national coordinator for Vox. In November 2019, he was elected to the Congress of Deputies representing the Valencia constituency. In the Congress, he sits on the committees for technology and security.

References 

1967 births
Living people
Members of the 14th Congress of Deputies (Spain)
Vox (political party) politicians
People from Madrid
Spanish engineers